Niekładź  (formerly German Neklatz) is a settlement in the administrative district of Gmina Gryfice, within Gryfice County, West Pomeranian Voivodeship, in northwestern Poland.

For the history of the region, see History of Pomerania.

The settlement has a population of 107.

References

Villages in Gryfice County